Kevin Huntley may refer to:

Kevin Huntley (gridiron football) (born 1982), defensive end
Kevin Huntley (lacrosse) (born 1986), lacrosse player